James S. J. Thomson was a Scottish amateur footballer who made over 100 appearances as a right back in the Scottish League for Queen's Park. He also played for Dumbarton and Third Lanark.

Career statistics

References 

Year of birth missing
Scottish footballers
Scottish Football League players
Queen's Park F.C. players
Association football fullbacks
Year of death missing
Place of birth missing
Dumbarton F.C. players
Third Lanark A.C. players